Grace-Charis Bassey Effah (born 14 December 1989) is a Nigerian actress and presenter. She has won six awards throughout her career, including the Most Promising Act of the Year award at the 9th Africa Movie Academy Awards. She changed her name after an encounter with God to Grace-Charis Bassey.

Early life and education
Grace-Charis Bassey was born Uyu Effah on 14 December 1989 in Cross River State, a coastal state in Southern Nigeria. Her father, Lieutenant Commander Asido Bassey Effah, was a commander in the Nigerian Navy.

She had her primary and secondary education at Hillside International Nursery & Primary School and Nigerian Navy Secondary School, Port Harcourt respectively. She furthered her studies at the University of Calabar, majoring in Genetics and Bio-Technology. While in secondary school, she adopted the first name Belinda after her brother suggested that she and her siblings change their names. According to an interview with The Punch Newspaper, she claimed that the disciplinary nature of her dad towards his 14 children was very helpful in shaping her career.

Career
She made her Nollywood television debut in the 2005 TV series Shallow Waters. Afterwards, she took a break from the series to feature in the reality show Next Movie Star. She finished 5th, and was never evicted from the house.

She was once a television presenter for Sound City, a Nigerian Entertainment cable station. However, she left the station to start her own TV show titled Lunch Break with Belinda.

She is the CEO and founder of GCB Empire, a Nigeria-based clothing and fashion brand.

In 2022, Iké Udé's portrait of her was featured in the Nollywood Portraits exhibition at the Smithsonian National Museum of African Art.

Television

Filmography

Accolades

Personal life 
In 2016, she gave birth to a son in the United States. She has kept the identity of the child's father private.

In 2021, she publicly announced that she would like to be addressed as Grace-Charis Bassey rather than as Belinda Effah. She explained that, on 15 August 2020, she had a divine encounter with God that prompted her to change her name to Grace. Charis is a word of Greek origin that also means "grace."

See also
 List of Nigerian actors

References

Actresses from Cross River State
Nigerian film actresses
21st-century Nigerian actresses
Living people
Most Promising Actor Africa Movie Academy Award winners
1989 births
Nigerian film award winners
University of Calabar alumni
Participants in Nigerian reality television series
Nigerian Christians
Nigerian television presenters